Tapio Kalevi Nirkko (born 24 August 1984 in Espoo) is a Finnish sailor. He competed at the 2008 and 2012 Summer Olympics in the Men's Finn class.

References

Finnish male sailors (sport)
Living people
Olympic sailors of Finland
Sailors at the 2008 Summer Olympics – Finn
Sailors at the 2012 Summer Olympics – Finn
Sportspeople from Espoo
1984 births
Sailors at the 2016 Summer Olympics – Finn